Mihai Adam (3 July 1940 – 11 December 2015) was a Romanian football player who played as a striker.

Career

Mihai Adam was born on 3 July 1940 in Câmpia Turzii, Romania and started playing football in 1956 at local club, Industria Sârmei. In 1962 he was transferred at Universitatea Cluj where on 19 August he made his Divizia A debut under coach Constantin Rădulescu in a 2–1 home victory in front of Politehnica Timișoara. In the 1964–65 Divizia A season, Adam who made a successful couple in the team's offence with Zoltán Ivansuc, won for the first time the top-goalscorer of the season title with 18 goals scored, also he helped the club win the Cupa României, being used by coach Andrei Sepci in the whole game of the 2–1 victory from the final against Argeș Pitești. In the following season, Adam made his debut in European competitions, playing four games in which he scored a goal that helped "U" Cluj eliminate Austrian team, Wiener Neustadt in the first round of the 1965–66 European Cup Winners' Cup, being eliminated in the following round by Atlético Madrid. In the 1967–68 season he scored 15 goals in 26 league appearances, winning his second top-goalscorer title. In the following season he was selected to do his army service in Arad so he played for local club, Vagonul. Afterwards he returned to play for three more seasons at "U" Cluj, in the last one he scored 10 goals which helped the club finish on the 3rd position. Then he moved at CFR Cluj where he reunited with coach Constantin Rădulescu and in the 1973–74 season he won for the third and final time the top-goalscorer of the league title with a personal record of 23 goals scored as the team scored a total of 40, a performance that helped them avoid relegation as they finished on the 14th position out of 18 teams from the league. In his last season as a player, Mihai Adam scored 9 goals in 25 appearances, being unable to save CFR from avoiding relegation this time, his last Divizia A appearance being on 20 June 1976 in a 1–0 loss in front of Steaua București, having a total of 160 goals scored in 353 matches in the competition. After he ended his playing career, Adam became a referee, arbitrating games including in Romania's top-league Divizia A. In the last years of his life, he lived in Cluj-Napoca, being ill of Alzheimer's disease and died on 11 December 2015 at age 75. The Mihai Adam Stadium from Câmpia Turzii is named in his honor. Even do he played for Romania's under-23 national team and Romania B, Mihai Adam never played for Romania's senior team and on 13 May 2020, Gazeta Sporturilor included him in a first 11 of best Romanian players who never played for the senior national team.

Honours

Club
Universitatea Cluj
Cupa României: 1964–65

Individual
Divizia A top-goalscorer: 1965, 1968, 1974

References

External links

1940 births
2015 deaths
People from Câmpia Turzii
Romanian footballers
Association football forwards
Liga I players
Liga II players
CSM Câmpia Turzii players
Vagonul Arad players
FC Universitatea Cluj players
CFR Cluj players
Romanian football referees
Deaths from Alzheimer's disease